Giosuè Zilocchi (born 15 January 1997) is an Italian rugby union player. His usual position is as a Prop, and he currently plays for London Irish.

He played with Zebre from 2018 to 2022.

In 2016 and 2017, Zilocchi was named in the Italy Under 20 squad. From 2018 he was also named in the Italy squad.

References

External links 

1997 births
Living people
Italian rugby union players
Italy international rugby union players
Rugby union props
Rugby Calvisano players
Zebre Parma players
Rugby Lyons Piacenza players
London Irish players